Yago Gomes do Nascimento (born 8 September 2001) is a Swiss-Brazilian professional footballer who plays as a midfielder for St. Gallen U21 in the Swiss Promotion League.

Early life
Gomes was born in Beberibe, Brazil to a Brazilian father and Swiss mother, and holds both nationalities. He moved from Brazil, to the Swiss town Flums at the age of 4.

Career
Gomes began playing football locally in Flums, before moving to the academies of St. Gallen and Vaduz. Gomes made his professional debut with Vaduz in a 2–0 Swiss Super League loss to FC St. Gallen on 20 January 2021.

References

External links
 
 SFL Profile
 Vaduz profile

2001 births
Living people
Sportspeople from Ceará
Brazilian footballers
Swiss men's footballers
Brazilian people of Swiss descent
Swiss people of Brazilian descent
Association football midfielders
FC Vaduz players
FC St. Gallen players
Swiss expatriate sportspeople in Liechtenstein
Swiss Super League players
Swiss Challenge League players
Swiss Promotion League players
Brazilian expatriate footballers
Brazilian expatriate sportspeople in Liechtenstein
Expatriate footballers in Liechtenstein
Swiss expatriate footballers